This is a list of school districts in Arizona. It is divided by county.

Apache County

Alpine Elementary School District #7
Chinle Unified School District #24
Concho Elementary School District #6
Ganado Unified School District #20
McNary Elementary School District #23
Red Mesa Unified School District #27
Round Valley Unified School District #10
Saint Johns Unified School District #1
Sanders Unified School District #18
Vernon Elementary School District #9
Window Rock Unified School District #8

Cochise County

Apache Elementary School District #42
Ash Creek Elementary School District #53
Benson Unified School District #9
Bisbee Unified School District #2
Bowie Unified School District #14
Cochise County Accommodation School District #1
Cochise Elementary School District #26
Cochise Technology District #1
Double Adobe Elementary School District #45
Douglas Unified School District #27
Elfrida Elementary School District #12
Fort Huachuca Accommodation District  
McNeal Elementary School District #55
Naco Elementary School District #23
Palominas Elementary School District #49
Pearce Elementary School District #22
Pomerene Elementary School District #64
San Simon Unified School District #18
Sierra Vista Unified School District #68
St. David Unified School District #21
Tombstone Unified School District #1
Valley Union High School District #22
Willcox Unified School District #13

Coconino County

Chevelon Butte School District #5
Coconino Association for Vocations, Industry and Technology #1
Coconino County Regional Accommodation School District #99 
Flagstaff Unified School District #1
Fredonia-Moccasin Unified School District #6
Grand Canyon Unified School District #4
Maine Consolidated Elementary School District #10
Page Unified School District #8
Tuba City Unified School District #15
Williams Unified School District #2

Gila County

Gila County Regional School District #49
Globe Unified School District #1
Hayden-Winkelman Unified School District #41
Miami Unified School District #40 
Payson Unified School District #10
Pine-Strawberry Elementary School District #12
San Carlos Unified School District #20
Tonto Basin Elementary School District #33
Young Elementary School District #5

Graham County

Bonita Elementary School District #16
Fort Thomas Unified School District #7
Gila Institute for Technology #02
Graham County Special Services #99
Klondyke School District #9
Pima Unified School District #6
Safford Unified School District #1
Solomon Elementary School District #5
Thatcher Unified School District #4

Greenlee County

Blue Elementary School District #22
Duncan Unified School District #2
Morenci Unified School District #18

La Paz County

Bicentennial Union High School District #76
Bouse Elementary School District #26
Parker Unified School District #27
Quartzsite Elementary School District #4
Salome Elementary School District #30 
Wenden Elementary School District #19

Maricopa County

Agua Fria Union High School District #216
Aguila Elementary School District #63
Alhambra Elementary School District #68
Arlington Elementary School District #47
Avondale Elementary School District #44
Balsz Elementary School District #31
Buckeye Elementary School District #33
Buckeye Union High School District #201
Cartwright Elementary School District #83
Cave Creek Unified School District #93
Chandler Unified School District #80
Creighton Elementary School District #14
Deer Valley Unified School District #97
Dysart Unified School District #89
East Valley Institute of Technology #1
Fountain Hills Unified School District #98
Fowler Elementary School District #45
Gila Bend Unified School District #24
Gilbert Unified School District #41
Glendale Elementary School District #40
Glendale Union High School District #205
Higley Unified School District #60
Isaac School District #5
Kyrene Elementary School District #28
Laveen Elementary School District #59
Liberty Elementary School District #25
Litchfield Elementary School District #79
Littleton Elementary School District #65
Madison Elementary School District #38
Maricopa County Regional District #509 
Mesa Public Schools #4
Mobile Elementary School District #86
Morristown Elementary School District #75
Murphy Elementary School District #21
Nadaburg Unified School District #81
Osborn Elementary School District #8
Palo Verde Elementary School District #49
Paloma Elementary School District #94
Paradise Valley Unified School District #69
Pendergast Elementary School District #92
Peoria Unified School District #11
Phoenix Elementary School District #1
Phoenix Union High School District #210
Queen Creek Unified School District #95
Riverside Elementary School District #2
Roosevelt Elementary School District #66
Saddle Mountain Unified School District #90
Scottsdale Unified School District #48
Sentinel Elementary School District #71
Tempe Elementary School District #3
Tempe Union High School District #213
Tolleson Elementary School District #17
Tolleson Union High School District #214
Union Elementary School District #62
Washington Elementary School District #6
Western Maricopa Education Center #2
Wickenburg Unified School District #9
Wilson Elementary School District #7

Mohave County

Bullhead City Elementary School District #15
Colorado City Unified School District #14
Colorado River Union High School District #2
Hackberry School District #3
Kingman Unified School District #20
Lake Havasu Unified School District #1
Littlefield Unified School District #9
Mohave Valley Elementary School District #16
Owens-Whitney Elementary School District #6
Peach Springs Unified School District #8
Topock Elementary School District #12
Valentine Elementary School District #22
Western Arizona Vocational Education #50
Yucca Elementary School District #13

Navajo County

Blue Ridge Unified School District #32
Cedar Unified School District #25
Heber-Overgaard Unified School District #6
Holbrook Unified School District #3
Joseph City Unified School District #2
Kayenta Unified School District #27
Navajo County Accommodation District #99
Northeast Arizona Technological Institute of Vocational Education #36
Northern Arizona Vocational Institute of Technology #35
Piñon Unified School District #4
Show Low Unified School District #10
Snowflake Unified School District #5
Whiteriver Unified School District #20
Winslow Unified School District #1

Pima County

Ajo Unified School District #15
Altar Valley Elementary School District #51
Amphitheater Unified School District #10
Baboquivari Unified School District #40
Catalina Foothills Unified School District #16
Continental Elementary School District #39
Empire Elementary School District #37
Flowing Wells Unified School District #8
Marana Unified School District #6
Pima Accommodation District
Pima County Joint Technical Education District #11
Redington Elementary School District #44
Sahuarita Unified School District #30
San Fernando Elementary School District #35
Sunnyside Unified School District #12
Tanque Verde Unified School District #13
Tucson Unified School District #1
Vail Unified School District #20

Pinal County

Apache Junction Unified School District #43
Casa Grande Elementary School District #4
Casa Grande Union High School District #82
Central Arizona Valley Institute of Technology #1
Cobre Valley Institute of Technology #2
Coolidge Unified School District #21
Eloy Elementary School District #11
Florence Unified School District #1
J. O. Combs Unified School District #44
Mammoth-San Manuel Unified School District #8
Maricopa Unified School District #20
Mary C. O'Brien Accommodation School District
Oracle Elementary School District #2
Picacho Elementary School District #33 
Ray Unified School District #3
Red Rock Elementary School District #5 
Sacaton Elementary School District #18 
Santa Cruz Valley Union High School District #840
Stanfield Elementary School District #24 
Superior Unified School District #15
Toltec Elementary School District #22

Santa Cruz County

Nogales Unified School District #1
Patagonia Elementary School District #6
Patagonia Union High School District #20
Santa Cruz Elementary School District #28
Santa Cruz Valley Unified School District #35
Sonoita Elementary School District #25

Yavapai County

Ash Fork Joint Unified School District #31
Bagdad Unified School District #20
Beaver Creek School District #26
Camp Verde Unified School District #28
Canon Elementary School District #50
Chino Valley Unified School District #51
Clarkdale-Jerome Elementary School District #3
Congress Elementary School District #17 
Cottonwood-Oak Creek Elementary School District #6
Crown King Elementary School District #41 
Hillside Elementary School District #35
Humboldt Unified School District #22
Kirkland Elementary School District #23
Mayer Unified School District #43
Mingus Union High School District #4
Mountain Institute Joint Technological Education District #2
Prescott Unified School District #1
Sedona-Oak Creek Joint Unified School District #9
Seligman Unified School District #40
Skull Valley Elementary School District #15
Valley Academy for Career and Technology Education #1
Williamson Valley Elementary School District #2
Yarnell Elementary School District #52 
Yavapai Accommodation School District #99

Yuma County

Antelope Union High School District #50
Crane Elementary School District #13
Gadsden Elementary School District #32
Hyder Elementary School District #16 
Mohawk Valley Elementary School District #17
Somerton Elementary School District #11
Southwest Technical Education District of Yuma
Wellton Elementary School District #24 
Yuma Elementary School District #1
Yuma Union High School District #70

References

School districts
Arizona
School districts